The Argentine hake (Merluccius hubbsi) is a merluccid hake of the genus Merluccius, found in the southwestern  Atlantic Ocean, along the coast of Argentina, and Uruguay. This fish was described by an Argentine ichthyologist, Tomás Marini in 1933.

It's very similar to Merluccius merluccius (European hake), and it can reach a length of 95 cm (but commonly 50-65 cm), and weigh up to 5 kg. It lives at depths from 100 to 200 m, and it feeds on crustaceans, squids and fish (anchovies and smaller hakes). It migrates southwards in spring and northwards in autumn. This fish is usually sold fresh and frozen as one of the main fishing exports of Argentina.

A  new species of hake, Merluccius patagonicus, was described for the south west Atlantic in 2003. This would be a third hake species in the area in addition to M. hubbsi and M. australis but some authorities consider this taxon to be a synonymous with M. hubbsi.

References

Argentine hake
Fish of Argentina
Fish of the Western Atlantic
Argentine hake